This article lists state and national mottos for the world's nations. The mottos for some states lacking general international recognition, extinct states, non-sovereign nations, regions, and territories are listed, but their names are not bolded.

A state motto is used to describe the intent or motivation of the state in a short phrase. For example, it can be included on a country's flag, coat of arms, or currency. Some countries do not have a national motto.

Current sovereign countries

: There is no god but God; Muhammad is the messenger of God.
: You, Albania, give me honour, give me the name Albanian
: By the people and for the people.
: Strength united is stronger.
: Virtue is stronger when united
: Each endeavouring, all achieving
: In Union and Liberty.
: One Nation, One Culture.
: No official motto. Formerly Advance Australia.
: No official motto.
: No official motto. Unofficial: The Land of Fire

: Forward, Upward, Onward Together
: No official motto.
:  No official motto. Recognized official national slogan and war cry: Victory to Bengal (জয় বাংলা).
: Pride and Industry
: No official motto. Unofficial motto: Long Live Belarus! (Žyvie Biełaruś!)
: Unity makes strength.
: Under the shade I flourish.
: Fellowship, Justice, Labour.
: No official motto.
: Unity makes strength.
: No official motto.
: Rain.
: Order and progress
: Always in service with God's guidance.
: Unity Makes Strength.
: Unity, Progress, Justice.
: Unity, Work, Progress
: Nation, Religion, King
: Peace, Work, Fatherland

: From sea to sea
: Unity, Work, Progress.
: Unity, Dignity, Work.
: Unity, Work, Progress
: Through Reason Or By Force
: No official motto. Serve The People! is the motto of the Chinese Communist Party. "Peaceful Unification. One country two systems". “和平统一。一国两制” is the motto used in the context of Chinese reunification and the Chinese civil war.
: No official motto. Nationalism, Democracy, Welfare is the motto of the Kuomintang and ROC government. ""Three Principles of the People unites China". “三民主義統一中國” is the motto used in the context of Chinese unification and the Chinese civil war. Unofficial:  "Taiwan Number One" is a popular motto used online in support of Taiwan.
: Freedom and order.
: Unity, Solidarity, Development.
: Justice, Peace, Work.
: Unity, Work, Progress.
: No official motto; de facto motto: Always live work and peace!.
: Unity, Discipline, Labor.
: No official motto. Unofficial motto: God and Croats.
: Fatherland or death
: No official motto
: Truth prevails
: No official motto. Royal motto of Margrethe II: God's help, the love of the people, Denmark's strength.
: Unity, Equality, Peace.
: After God, the Earth (Dominican Creole French: Après Bondié, C'est la Ter).
: God, Fatherland, Liberty
: Unity, Action, and Progress
: God, homeland, and freedom.
: No official motto.
: God, Union, Liberty
: Unity, Peace, Justice
: Victory to the Masses! (also in English).
: No official motto.
: We are the fortress
: Currently no official motto. Formerly: Ethiopia holds up her hands unto God (Itiyopia tabetsih edewiha habe Igziabiher), taken from Psalm 68:31.
: Fear God and honour the King
: No official motto. When a Kingdom was planned as a form of government in 1917, the motto was "Strong, Stable, Free"
: Liberty, equality, fraternity
: Union, Work, Justice
: Progress, Peace, Prosperity.
: Strength is in Unity! (Dzala ertobashia).
: No official motto, de facto: Unity and justice and freedom.
: Freedom and Justice.
: Freedom or Death (Eleftheria i thanatos).
: Ever Conscious of God We Aspire, Build and Advance as One People.
: Grow Free and Fertile.
: Work, Justice, Solidarity.
: Unity, Struggle, Progress.
: One People, One Nation, One Destiny.
: Liberty, equality, fraternity
: Free, sovereign and independent
: Currently no official motto. Formerly With the help of God for Homeland and Freedom, battle cry of Prince Francis II Rákóczi in the early 18th century.

: No official motto.
: Truth alone triumphs (Satyameva Jayate).
: Unity in diversity (Old Javanese: Bhinneka Tunggal Ika).
: God is the Greatest (Allahu Akbar). De facto motto: Independence, freedom, the Islamic Republic (Esteqlāl, āzādī, jomhūrī-ye eslāmī). 
: God is the Greatest (Allahu Akbar).
: No official motto. Historical use: Ireland forever (also in English).
: No official motto. Unofficial: If you will it, it is no dream (Im Tirtzu, Ein zo Agadah).
: No official motto.
: Out of many, One People
: No official motto. Charter Oath or The Oath in Five Articles (Japanese: 五箇条の御誓文; Gokajō no Goseimon) was previously used between 1868 to 1912) 
: God, Homeland, King (Jordanian Arabic: الله، الوطن، الملك; Allāh, Al-Waṭan, Al-Malīk).

: Freedom, Unity, Progress!.
: All pull together.
: Health, Peace and Prosperity.
: No official motto. De facto motto: Strong and Prosperous Nation (Gangseong Daeguk).
: No official motto. De facto motto: To broadly benefit the human world (Hongik Ingan).
: No official motto. Proposed motto: Honour, Duty, Homeland.
: God, The Nation, The Emir.
: No official motto.
: Peace, independence, democracy, unity and prosperity
: We are all for the Country, the Sublime and the Flag.
: Peace, Rain, Prosperity.
: The love of liberty brought us here
: No official motto.
: For God, Prince and Fatherland.
: No official motto, Freedom, Unity, Prosperity used on coins since 2015.
: We wish to remain what we are 
: Love, Ancestral-land, Progress.
: Unity and Freedom.
: Unity is strength.
: State of the Mahal Dibiyat (Al-Dawlat Al-Mahaldheebiya).
: One people, one goal, one faith.
: Strength and consistency.
: Accomplishment/Achievement through Joint Effort.
:  Honor, Fraternity, Justice.
: Star and key of the Indian Ocean.
: No official motto, The Homeland is First is the motto of the Mexican Congress.
: Peace, Unity, Liberty.
: No official motto.
: With God's help.
: No official motto.
: No official motto. Unofficial motto: May Montenegro be eternal!. From the national anthem.
: God, the Country, the King (Allāh, Al-Waṭan, Al-Malīk). Sovereign's motto: إن تَنصُروا اللهَ ينصُرُکُم (ʾIn tanṣurū 'Ilaha yanṣurukum) (Arabic: If you aid God, He will aid you)
: No official motto.
: Currently no official motto. Formerly: Happiness through harmony (Samaggānaṃ tapo sukho).
: Unity, liberty, justice
: God's will first
: Mother and motherland are greater than heaven (Janani Janmabhumishcha Swargadapi Gariyasi)
: I will maintain.
: No official motto, formerly Onward
: In God We Trust
: Fraternity, Work, Progress.
: Unity and Faith, Peace and Progress.
: No official motto.
: No official motto.
: No official motto. Royal motto of Harald V: Everything for Norway and Eidsvoll oath: United and loyal until the mountains of Dovre crumble
: No official national motto.

: Faith, Unity, Discipline (Iman, Ittihad, Nazm).
: No official national motto.
: No official motto, Unofficial: From the river to the sea, Palestine will be free (Min alnahr 'iilaa al-bahr, satakun Filastin huratan).
: For the benefit of the world.
: Unity in Diversity.
: Peace and justice.
: Steady and happy for the union.
: For God, for the people, for nature and for the country.
: No official motto. Unofficial mottos of Poland include: For our freedom and yours; and God, Honour, Fatherland.
: This is my blissful beloved homeland

: No official motto.
: No official motto. Formerly Nothing without God, which has been proposed to return. Before Nihil sine Deo, Toți în unu ("All for One") was used as the motto of Romania for a short period of time.
: No official motto at sovereignty level. 
: Chuvash Republic.
: Workers of the world, unite!.
:Sakha Republic.
 Unofficial: We can!.
: Unity, Work, Patriotism
: Liberty, Democracy, Unity
: Country Above Self.
: The land, the people, the light.
: Peace and justice
: God be the Foundation of Samoa.
: Liberty
: Unity, Discipline, Work.
: There is no God other than God and Muhammad is the Messenger of God (Lā ʾilāha illā l-Lāh; Muḥammadu r-rasūlu l-Lāh).
: One people, one goal, one faith.
: No official motto. Unofficial: Only Unity Saves the Serbs.
: The end crowns the work.
: Unity, freedom, justice.
: Onward Singapore.
: Currently no official motto. Formerly (1939–1945) Faithful to Ourselves, Together Ahead!.
: No official motto.
: To lead is to serve
: No official motto. Currently unofficially and formerly officially (1947–2012) Arise Somalis!
: Diverse people unite or Unity in Diversity (ǀXam: ǃke e꞉ ǀxarra ǁke).
: Justice, Liberty, Prosperity
: Further beyond.
: No official motto.
: Victory is Ours (An-Naṣr Linā).
: Justice, piety, loyalty.
: No official national motto. Royal motto of Carl XVI Gustaf: For Sweden – in the time.
: No official motto. Unofficial: One for all, all for one.
: Unity, Freedom, Socialism Ba'ath Party.

: Independence, Freedom, Homeland!.
: Freedom and Unity.
: No official motto. Unofficial: Nation, Religion, King (Chat, Satsana, Phra Mahakasat)
: Work, liberty, homeland.
: God and Tonga are my Inheritance.
: Together we aspire, together we achieve.
: Freedom, Order, Justice (Ḥoṛiya, Niẓam, 'Adāla).
: No official motto. Motto of the Parliament of Turkey: Sovereignty unconditionally belongs to the People. Other mottos: How happy is the one who says I am a Turk, Either independence or death, Peace at Home, Peace in the World (Turkish: Yurtta barış, dünyada barış)(originally: yurtta sulh, cihanda sulh).
: Turkmenistan is the motherland of Neutrality.

: Tuvalu for the Almighty.
: For God and My Country (also in English).
: No official motto. Glory to Ukraine! Glory to the heroes! is the military greeting and de facto motto.
: God, Nation, President (Allah, al-Waṭan, al-Ra'īs).
: No official motto. Sovereign's motto: Dieu et mon droit (French: God and my right) in England, Wales and Northern Ireland; In My Defens God Me Defend in Scotland.
: In God We Trust (official), E Pluribus Unum (Latin: Out of many, one), (de facto). See also list of U.S. state and territory mottos
: Liberty or Death.
: The Strength is in The Justice! ( / )
: In God we stand.
: No official motto. Pope Francis' personal motto: By Giving mercy and by choosing.
: Currently no official motto. Historical: God and Federation.
: Independence, Liberty, Happiness.
: God, Homeland, Revolution, Unity (Allāh, Al-Waṭan, Ath-Thawrah, Al-Waḥdah).
: One Zambia, One Nation
: Unity, Freedom, Work

Semi autonomous dependencies 
: Unity, Strength and Endurance
: Samoa Muamua le Atua  (Samoan)
: Semper progrediens  (Latin)
: Hoc Signo Tuetur Pius, Hoc Signo Vincitur Inimicus (Latin)
: Antes morrer livres que em paz sujeitos (Portuguese)
 Basque Country:  (Basque: The seven are one)
: Quo fata ferunt (Latin: Whither the fates carry us)
: Research and Discovery
: In tutela nostra Limuria (Latin: "Limuria is in our charge")
:Unofficial Vigilate  (Latin: Be watchful)
: Kentoc'h mervel eget bezañ saotret  (Breton: Rather death than dishonour)
: Océano (Spanish: Ocean)
: No official motto. Traditional motto / unofficial: Som i Serem (Catalan: "We are and We will be")
: He hath founded it upon the seas
: Maju Pulu Kita (Cocos Islands Malay: Onward our island)
: No official motto.
: Traditional motto / unofficial; He hanga te Atu'a he pakea te ma'eha ote mori nei ite he nua ta'atoa (Rapa Nui: "May God let the clarity of this vital light be extended to all peoples")
: Sovereign's motto: Dieu et mon droit (French: God and my right).
: Desire the Right
: No official motto.
: Liberté, égalité, fraternité  (French: Liberty, equality, fraternity)
: Tahiti Nui Māre'are'a (Tahitian: Great Tahiti of the Golden Haze) 
: Hoc hic mysterium fidei firmiter profitemur (Latin: "Here, we firmly profess this mystery of faith")
: Montis Insignia Calpi and Nulli Expugnabilis Hosti 
: No official motto.
: No official motto.
: No official motto.
: Quocunque Ieceris Stabit (Latin: Whithersoever you throw it, it will stand)
: No official motto.
: No official motto.  Unofficial motto/proverb: ھیچ دۆستێک جگە لە چیاکان (Kurdish: "No friends but the mountains").  Also used is the title of the regional anthem "Ey Reqîb" (Kurdish: "O, Enemy")
: Das Ilhas, As Mais Belas E Livres (Portuguese: Of the Islands, the Most Beautiful and Free)
: A people of excellence, moulded by nature, nurtured by God 
: Terre de parole, terre de partage (French: Land of speech, land of sharing) 
: No official motto.
: No official motto.
: Semper Ascendens (Latin: Always Ascending).
: Joannes est nomen ejus (Latin: "John is his name"). Taken from the Vulgate translation of Luke 1:63, referring to the fact that the island's former name was "San Juan" (now the capital's name) in honour of Saint John the Baptist.
: Florebo quocumque ferar (Latin: I will flourish wherever I am brought)
: Remis velisque (Latin: With oars and sails)
: Loyal and unshakeable
: A Mare Labor (Latin: From the Sea, Work)
: Sovereign's motto: In My Defens God Me Defend (Often shown abbreviated as IN DEFENS) and Nemo Me Impune Lacessit (Latin: No-one provokes me with impunity)
: An.Tu.Do. ANimus TUus DOminus (Latin: Courage is your lord).
: Semper progrediens (Latin: Always progressing)
: Leo terram propriam protegat (Latin: "Let the lion protect his own land") 
: Tokelau mo te Atua (Tokelauan: Tokelau For The Almighty) 
: Our faith is our strength 
: No official motto. 
: Cymru am byth (Welsh: Wales Forever, alternatively Long live Wales)
: Liberté, égalité, fraternité  (French: Liberty, equality, fraternity)
: United In Pride And Hope: Zanzibar kwa Afrika; Zanzibar kwa ajili ya Dunia (Swahili: "Zanzibar for Africa — Zanzibar for the world")
: Islands of PeaceHistorical countries
: Indivisibiliter ac Inseparabiliter (Latin: "Indivisible and inseparable unity").
 Azerbaijan Democratic Republic: 
 Kingdom of Bavaria: In Treue fest (German: "Steadfast in loyalty") 
 Republic of Biafra: Peace, Unity, Freedom: Пралетарыі ўсіх краін, яднайцеся! (Praletaryi ŭsich krain, jadnajciesja!) (Belarusian: Workers of the world, unite!)
: Independência ou Morte! (Portuguese: Independence or Death!)
: "King of Kings, Ruling Over Kings" (Greek: βασιλεὺς βασιλέων, βασιλεύων βασιλευόντων; Basileus Basileōn, Basileuōn Basileuontōn) under the Palaiologos dynasty.
: No official motto. Unofficial: Nationalism, Democracy, Welfare, the historical motto of the Kuomintang and the Nationalist government.
: Deo vindice (Latin: With God as our defender/protector)
 (1918–1993): Pravda vítězí (Czech), Pravda víťazí (Slovak), Veritas vincit (Latin), all meaning "Truth prevails" 
: Concordia res parvae crescunt (Small things flourish by concord; Literally translated as: Together the small will grow)
 ሞዓ አንበሰ ዘአምነባደ ይሁዳ (Moa Ambassa ze Imnegede Yehuda) (Ge'ez: Conquering Lion of the Tribe of Judah).
: Regna cadunt luxu surgunt virtutibus urbes! (Latin: Fall, you kingdoms of luxury, for the cities of virtue shall thrive!)
: Various mottos ranging from "Liberty, Equality, Fraternity, or Death." (French: Liberté, Égalité, Fraternité ou la Mort) to "Unity, indivisibility of the Republic; liberty, equality, brotherhood or death" (French: Unité, Indivisibilité de la République ; Liberté, Egalité, Fraternité ou la mort).
: Montjoie Saint Denis! (French)
 (1940–1944): Travail, Famille, Patrie (French: Work, Family, Homeland)
: Hoc hic mysterium fidei firmiter profitemur (Latin: Here is the mystery of faith that we strongly profess)
 (1949–1990): Einigkeit und Recht und Freiheit (German: Unity and justice and freedom)
 (1949–1990): Proletarier aller Länder, vereinigt Euch! (German: Workers of all countries, unite!)
 (1871–1918): Gott mit uns (German: God with us)
 (1933–1945): Ein Volk, Ein Reich, Ein Führer (German: One People, One Realm, One Leader.) 
 (1832–1924 and 1935–67): Ίσχύς μου ή άγάπη του λαού (Iskhis mou i ayapi tou laou)
: A.E.I.O.U. "All the world is subject to Austria" (German: Alles Erdreich ist Österreich untertan. Latin: Austria est imperare orbis universo)
: Ua Mau ke Ea o ka Āina i ka Pono (Hawaiian: The life of the land is perpetuated in righteousness)
 Imperial State of Iran: مرا داد فرمود و خود داور است (Marā dād farmūd-o khod dāvar ast) (Persian: Justice He bids me do, as He will judge me).
 Kingdom of Italy: Foedere et Religione Tenemur (FERT) (Latin: We are held together by pact and by religion), Fortitudo Eius Rempublicam Tenet (FERT) (Latin: 'His bravery [or strength] preserves [or defends] the state')
: Per l'onore d'Italia (Italian: For the honor of Italy) 
Ancient Japan: 養正之心ヲ弘ム (Yōsei-no kokoro-wo hiromu) (Japanese: "spread the spirit of nurturing rightness"), 積慶重暉 (Sekkei Chōki) (Japanese, "accumulate joyousness and stack brightness"), 掩ヒテ㆓ヲ㆒而為ス㆑ト (Ame-no-shita-wo ōhi-te ihe-to nasu) (Japanese, "cover  and make it roof" aka Hakkō Ichiu (八紘一宇))
: 開国進取 (Kaikoku Shinshu) (Japanese: "Open nation and do enterprising") Charter Oath (1868–) -> 大東亜新秩序建設 (Dai-tōa Shin-chitsujo Kensetsu) (Japanese: "Establishing of Great East Asian New Order", it means "東亜に於ける国際正義の確立、共同防共の達成、新文化の創造、経済結合の実現を期す" ("Hoping for establishing international righteousness, co-preventing communism, creating new culture and actualizing economic connection in East Asia")) :ja:基本国策要綱 (1940–)
: 광명천지 (光明天地, Kwangmyeong Cheonji) "Let there be light across the land"
: Independencia, Unión, Religion (Spanish: "Independence, Union, Religion"), the three guarantees.
: Equidad en la Justicia (Spanish: "Equity in Justice")
: Libertate Unanimus, (Latin: United in Freedom)
: Quaerite Prime Regnum Dei (Latin: Seek ye first the kingdom of God) 
: Pergo et Perago (Latin: I undertake and I achieve) 
: دولت ابد مدت‎ (Devlet-i Ebed-müddet) (Turkish: "The Eternal State")
 Fourth Philippine Republic: Isang Bansa, Isang Diwa (Filipino: "One Country, One Spirit"). Abolished after the 1986 People Power Revolution.
: Pro fide, lege, et rege (Latin: "For Faith, Law, and King"); Si Deus nobiscum quis contra nos? (Latin: If God is with us, then who is against us?)
: In Hoc Signo Vinces (Latin: "By this sign you shall conquer"). In a legend retold in the national epic Os Lusiadas by Luís Vaz de Camões, the first King of Portugal saw the Quinas (the five blue inescutcheons with silver bezants), in a miracle, during the Battle of Ourique. The usage of this motto is well documented on coins, monuments and documents.
: Suum cuique (Latin: "To each his own") 1525–1947
: Sloboda se ne prodaje za sve zlato svijeta (Croatian: Freedom is not sold for all the gold in the world)
: Sit Nomine Digna (Latin: May she be worthy of the name)
: Съ нами Богъ! (S nami Bog!) (Russian: God is with us!) and За Вѣру, Царя и Отечество! (Za Veru, Tsarya i Otechestvo!) (Russian: For Faith, For Tsar, For Fatherland)
 Russian State: Единая и Неделимая Россия! (Yedinaya i Nedelimaya Rossiya!) (Russian: United and Indivisible Russia!) and Симъ побѣдиши! (Sim pobedishi!) (Russian: In this, conquer!)
Roman Empire and previously Roman Republic: Senatus Populusque Romanus (Latin: The Senate and people of Rome, often abbreviated SPQR)
: Ex Unitate Vires (Latin: Union is Strength)
: Unité, Travail, Justice (French: Unity, Work, Justice) 
: Dum Spiro, Spero (Latin: "While I breathe, I hope")
: In my defens God me defend.
: Omnia Juncta in Uno (Latin: "All Joined into One")
 Siam (1873–1910) : สพฺเพสํ สงฺฆภูตานํ สามคฺคี วุฑฺฒิ สาธิกา (Pāli: शब्बेसम् सम्घभुतनम् समग्घि भुद्धि सधिक, Sabbesaṃ saṃghabhūtānaṃ samagghī vuḍḍhi sadhikā, "Unity amongst those uniting brings about success and prosperity")
: Пролетарии всех стран, соединяйтесь! (Proletarii vsekh stran, soyedinyaytes'!) (Russian: Proletarians of all nations, unite!)  (Also translated into the languages of the other fourteen republics)
: Una, Grande y Libre (Spanish: One, Great and Free) and Plus Ultra (Latin: Further Beyond)
: Pax tibi Marce, evangelista meus (Latin: "Peace be to you Mark, my evangelist")
: Ðộc lập, Tự do, Hạnh phúc (Vietnamese: Independence, Liberty, Happiness)
: 1954–67: Tổ quốc, Danh dự, Trách nhiệm (Vietnamese: Fatherland, Honor, Responsibility); 1967–75: Tổ quốc, Công minh, Liêm chính (Vietnamese: Fatherland, Justice, Integrity)

: Dreptate, Frăție (Romanian: "Justice, Brotherhood").
: To dwell together in unity Kingdom of Württemberg: Furchtlos und treu (German: Fearless and faithful)
: "Brotherhood and unity". (Serbo-Croatian: Братство и јединство / Bratstvo i jedinstvo, Macedonian: Братство и единство, Slovene: Bratstvo in enotnost, Albanian: Vllaznim-Bashkim, later Vëllazërim-Bashkim, Hungarian: Testvériség és egység, Romanian: Frăție și unitate, Ukrainian: Братерство і єдність)
: Paix — Justice — Travail'' (French: Peace — Justice — Work)

Notes

References

National
Mottos